Felipe Santos Martins (born 12 November 1990) is a Brazilian football player who last played for Song Lam Nghe An.

Club career
He made his professional debut in the Segunda Liga for Desportivo Aves on 8 August 2015 in a game against Sporting Covilhã.

References

1990 births
People from Guarulhos
Living people
Brazilian footballers
Brazilian expatriate footballers
Expatriate footballers in Portugal
A.C. Alcanenense players
U.D. Leiria players
C.D. Aves players
Liga Portugal 2 players
F.C. Vizela players
Association football forwards
Footballers from São Paulo (state)